Schofield Haigh (19 March 1871 – 27 February 1921) was a Yorkshire and England cricketer. He played for eighteen seasons for Yorkshire County Cricket Club, for England from the 1898/99 tour to 1912, and was a Wisden Cricketer of the Year in 1901.

Life and career
Born in Berry Brow, Huddersfield, Yorkshire, England, Haigh played club cricket for Keighley Cricket Club, and made his debut for Yorkshire in 1895, playing for the Tykes until 1913. He played sporadically for England from 1898/99 to 1912, and was a Wisden Cricketer of the Year.

He bowled right-hand medium pace, but could vary it with slower or faster deliveries, and when the pitch helped him he made the ball spin back from the off. The usefulness of Haigh's break-back saw over 74 per cent of his wickets taken without assistance from fieldsmen – the highest of any bowler with over 500 wickets.

However, because he was of slight build, Haigh was not able to undertake arduous spells of bowling, and his output of overs was always low for a frontline bowler. Moreover, he lacked the pace to be threatening against top batsmen on a good pitch. Haigh was never considered for a tour of Australia, and his record in Test cricket – apart from one match on matting in South Africa – was modest compared to his exploits in the county game.

He has the lowest average of any bowler taking 1,000 wickets since 1895 except for Hedley Verity. Haigh was also a determined batsman, who hit 1,000 runs in 1904, and scored a hundred before lunch in 1901, and was a keen fieldsman.

Haigh began with Yorkshire as a fast bowler with a difficult slower ball. Using such methods, combined with the break-back, Haigh was seen in 1896 as the hard-wicket bowler Yorkshire were looking for. He took 84 wickets for just over 15 runs each, and took 8 for 78 on a good wicket against the Australians.

However, the following year the strain on his slight frame of bowling fast began to tell on Haigh, and though his 91 wickets at 18.75 placed him in the top twenty of the national averages, he was already noticed to be less formidable than Yorkshire's other bowlers on firm pitches, but quite unplayable after rain – as in the home games with Surrey and Derbyshire. Although he produced a skilful performance against Middlesex at Lord's on a hard pitch the following year, Haigh did comparatively little of note except on sticky wickets. On such sticky wickets his return of 14 for 43 beat Hampshire in a day's cricket. Haigh's batting developed and he averaged 26 in 1901, and saved Yorkshire from defeat at Worcestershire in 1900. That year, Haigh took 163 wickets for just over 14 each, and in 1902 he took 158 wickets in 799 overs.

Called to the Test side with a sticky wicket expected in 1905, Haigh had a surprising off-day and was not picked again until 1909. He came close to heading the national averages for five successive seasons – being only shaded out by Albert Hallam in 1907, in which year he took 13 for 40 against Warwickshire. Yorkshire bowlers such as Wilfred Rhodes and George Hirst were utilised in longer spells with Haigh benefiting later on. After a poor season in 1910, Haigh returned to form in 1911 and 1912. His 96 wickets for 11.41 was decisive in Yorkshire's County Championship win, but another unsuccessful Test appearance, and that he then aged forty-one made him decide to move into coaching at the end of 1913. He did retain his place for Yorkshire primarily as a batsman with a long series of useful – though never large innings, whilst his bowling lapsed into decline.

After 1913 Haigh was a coach at Winchester School, where he was responsible for the emergence of Douglas Jardine. He also umpired several first-class matches at the Scarborough Festival after he retired.

Haigh died prematurely in Taylor Hill, Huddersfield, in early 1921, as a result of a stroke.

References

External links
 
 Cricinfo page on Schofield Haigh
 The last resting place of Schofield Haigh

1871 births
1921 deaths
English cricket umpires
England Test cricketers
English cricketers
English cricketers of 1890 to 1918
Wisden Cricketers of the Year
Yorkshire cricketers
Cricketers from Huddersfield
Players cricketers
Marylebone Cricket Club cricketers
Lord Hawke's XI cricketers
C. I. Thornton's XI cricketers
North v South cricketers
Lord Londesborough's XI cricketers